West Canberra Football Club is a former Australian Rules Football club based in the Australian Capital Territory that played in the ACT AFL from 1974 – 1987. West Canberra's guernsey was black and white (similar to Collingwood), and the team was nicknamed the Magpies. West Canberra merged with Belconnen Football Club to form the Belconnen Magpies Football Club. West Canberra never won an ACT AFL premiership.

See also
Belconnen Magpies Football Club
AFL Canberra

External links
Canberra 1974-1990 Fullpointsfooty
Belconnen Magpies FC Website

AFL Canberra clubs
1974 establishments in Australia
Australian rules football clubs established in 1974
1987 disestablishments in Australia
Australian rules football clubs disestablished in 1987